Cillin Greene (born 12 February 1998) is an Irish athlete. He competed in the mixed 4 × 400 metres relay event at the 2020 Summer Olympics.

References

External links
 

1998 births
Living people
Irish male sprinters
Olympic athletes of Ireland
Athletes (track and field) at the 2020 Summer Olympics
Place of birth missing (living people)